Tati (18th/17th century BC) was an ancient Egyptian queen. She is the only queen known by name from the Fourteenth Dynasty. Her position is unknown.

Unlike the other queens for the Fourteenth Dynasty, Tati seems to have played an official political role. A total of eleven scarab name seals of Tati have been found. They bear both her name and her royal titles enclosed in a cartouche. Such seals are otherwise only known for kings, heirs apparent and royal treasurers of the Fourteenth Dynasty, and the use of the cartouche is attested otherwise mainly for kings. Tati's seals have been found at Leontopolis and Abydos. Since her scarabs are of two designs, this has allowed them to be dated to the reign of Sheshi, since the designs correspond to a change that took place during his reign, as evidenced by his hundreds of surviving seals. The most likely explanation for her prominence is that she was the wife of Sheshi.

The Egyptologist Kim Ryholt suggested that Tati's marriage was probably part of a dynastic alliance between Sheshi and the Kushite rulers of Kerma. This is suggested by the strong relations the Fourteenth Dynasty is known to have had with Kerma, as well as by the names of Tati and her presumed son. The name Tati is attested in earlier execration texts naming a Kushite queen (spouse of Awaw) as one of the enemies of the pharaoh. It is possible that this earlier Tati was an ancestor and namesake of the Egyptian queen. A royal lineage for Tati would also explain why she of all the consorts of the Fourteenth Dynasty was accorded such high status, since her marriage was one of equals, forming an alliance between kingdoms.

According to Ryholt, Tati's son by Sheshi was Nehesy (nḥsy), whose name means "the Nubian", referring to the region around Kerma. On this theory, Nehesy probably received his name from his mother. Since he is known to have been an old man at the time of his accession, it is likely that Tati had died by then. There are no references to her with the title of queen mother.

Ryholt's interpretation has been challenged by a newly found stela that places Nehesy at the end rather than the beginning of the Second Intermediate Period. According to the stela, he was the brother of the "king's sister", Tany, who was most likely of Theban origin, making it unlikely that his mother was Tati.

Notes

Bibliography

Nubian people
People of the Fourteenth Dynasty of Egypt
2nd-millennium BC deaths
2nd-millennium BC births
18th-century BC women
17th-century BC women
Year of birth unknown
Place of birth unknown
Year of death unknown
Queens consort of the Fourteenth Dynasty of Egypt